Eucalyptus arenicola, commonly known as the Holey Plains peppermint or Gippsland Lakes peppermint, is a tree or mallee that is endemic to south-east coastal areas of Victoria. It has rough, fibrous bark on its trunk and branches, glossy green, lance-shaped adult leaves, club-shaped buds arranged in groups of eleven to twenty five, white flowers and cup-shaped to hemispherical fruit.

Description
They are more or less the same colour on both surfaces. The mature buds are green to yellow, oval to club-shaped with a rounded operculum. Flowering occurs in winter and the flowers are white.

Taxonomy and naming
Eucalyptus arenicola was first formally described in 2008 by Kevin James Rule and the description was published in the journal Muelleria. The specific epithet (arenicola) is derived from the Latin words arena meaning "sand", and -cola meaning "dweller", referring to the species' habitat.

Distribution and habitat
The Holey Plains peppermint grows in sandy soils in coastal and near-coastal areas near the Gippsland Lakes between Bairnsdale and the Holey Plains.

References

Flora of Victoria (Australia)
Trees of Australia
arenicola
Myrtales of Australia
Plants described in 2008